James Martin Hayes (May 27, 1924 – August 2, 2016) was a Canadian prelate of the Catholic Church.

Hayes was born in Halifax, Nova Scotia, and ordained a priest on June 15, 1947.  He was appointed auxiliary bishop to the Archdiocese of Halifax, as well as titular bishop of Reperi, on February 5, 1965, and consecrated on April 20, 1965. Hayes participated at the Second Vatican Council. Pope Paul VI appointed him archbishop of the Archdiocese of Halifax on June 22, 1967. He was known as a leader in liturgical renewal. He resigned on November 6, 1990, and died on August 2, 2016, in a hospital in Halifax, Nova Scotia. He was 92.

References

External links
Catholic-Hierarchy
Halifax Archdiocese

1924 births
2016 deaths
Participants in the Second Vatican Council
20th-century Roman Catholic archbishops in Canada
People from Halifax, Nova Scotia
Roman Catholic archbishops of Halifax